Pitipana South Grama Niladhari Division is a Grama Niladhari Division of the Homagama Divisional Secretariat of Colombo District of Western Province, Sri Lanka. It has Grama Niladhari Division Code 484A.

Pitipana South is a surrounded by the Suwapubudugama, Dampe, Moonamale - Yakahaluwa, Dolahena and Pitipana North Grama Niladhari Divisions.

Demographics

Ethnicity 
The Pitipana South Grama Niladhari Division has a Sinhalese majority (98.8%). In comparison, the Homagama Divisional Secretariat (which contains the Pitipana South Grama Niladhari Division) has a Sinhalese majority (98.1%)

Religion 
The Pitipana South Grama Niladhari Division has a Buddhist majority (97.5%). In comparison, the Homagama Divisional Secretariat (which contains the Pitipana South Grama Niladhari Division) has a Buddhist majority (96.2%)

References 

Grama Niladhari Divisions of Homagama Divisional Secretariat